"Worstward Ho" is a prose piece by Samuel Beckett. Its title is a parody of Charles Kingsley's Westward Ho!. Written in English in 1983, it is the penultimate novella by Beckett.

Together with Company and Ill Seen Ill Said, it was collected in the volume Nohow On in 1989. Beckett’s most famous quote can be found in Worstward Ho –  "Ever tried. Ever failed. No matter. Try again. Fail again. Fail better."

References

Short stories by Samuel Beckett
1983 short stories